Princess Kuniko (邦子内親王; 1209 – 26, September 1283), also known as Princess Hoshi and Ankamon-in, was an Empress as the Honorary Mother (准母) of her brother Emperor Go-Horikawa.

Life
She was the daughter of Imperial Prince Morisada (守貞親王; 1179–1223) and Kitashirakawa-in, and thus granddaughter of Emperor Takakura.

In 1221, her brother Emperor Go-Horikawa became Emperor, and she was named his Honorary Empress.

She also acted as the surrogate mother of Emperor Kameyama.

She became a nun in 1235.

Notes

Japanese princesses
Japanese empresses
1209 births
1283 deaths